Ludekia is a genus of flowering plants belonging to the family Rubiaceae.

Its native range is Malesia.

Species
Species:

Ludekia bernardoi 
Ludekia borneensis

References

Rubiaceae
Rubiaceae genera